William Nesfield may refer to:
 William Andrews Nesfield, English soldier, landscape architect and artist
 William Eden Nesfield, his son, English architect